The Sanheming mine is a large iron mine located in Inner Mongolia in China. Sanheming represents an estimated reserve of 167 million tonnes of ore, grading 34.8% iron metal.

References 

Iron mines in China